Eryx jayakari, known commonly as the Arabian sand boa or Jayakar's sand boa, is a species of snake in the family Boidae. The species is endemic to the Arabian Peninsula and Iran where it spends the day buried in the sand.

Etymology
Both the specific name, jayakari, and one of the common names, Jayakar's sand boa, are in honor of Atmaram Sadashiv Jayakar (1844–1911), an Indian surgeon and naturalist.

Description
The eyes are very small and are located on the top of the head, which has a blunt snout and is wedge-shaped. This snake's colour is yellowish-grey or sandy-brown speckled with white flecks and transversely banded with dark marks.

Geographic range
The Arabian sand boa is native to the Arabian peninsula. Its geographic range includes Saudi Arabia, Oman, Yemen, Kuwait, and southern Iran, where a small number of specimens have been found in Khuzestan Province, Bushehr Province and Kerman Province.

Habitat
Eryx jayakari is a desert species of snake, living semi-underground in sand or soft soil.

Behaviour
The Arabian sand boa is largely nocturnal and is tolerant of a wide range of temperatures. During the day it buries itself deep in the sand but moves towards the surface at dusk. Here it remains slightly below the surface with just its eyes projecting, ready to pounce with a sideways flick of its head, on any small creature that happens to pass. Its prey includes short-fingered geckos (Stenodactylus spp.), the Baluch rock gecko (Bunopus tuberculatus), and worm lizards.

Conservation status
The Arabian sand boa is listed by the IUCN as being of "Least Concern". This is because it has a very wide range, is common in at least parts of that range, and no particular threats have been identified.

References

Further reading
Boulenger GA (1888). "Description of a New Snake from Muscat, Arabia". Ann. Mag. Nat. Hist., Sixth Series 6, 2 (12): 508-509. (Eryx jayakari, new species).
Boulenger GA (1893). Catalogue of the Snakes in the British Museum (Natural History). Volume I., Containing the Families ... Boidæ ... London: Trustees of the British Museum (Natural History). (Taylor and Francis, printers). xiii + 448 pp. + Plates I-XXVIII. (Eryx jayakari'', p. 129 + Plate V, Figure 3).

jayakari
Fauna of Iran
Reptiles of the Arabian Peninsula
Reptiles described in 1888
Taxa named by George Albert Boulenger